Key to My Soul is the third studio album by German recording artist Sarah Connor. It was released by X-Cell and Epic Records on 17 November 2003 in German-speaking Europe. As with her previous albums, Green Eyed Soul (2001) and Unbelievable (2002), Connor reunited with songwriting and production duo Rob Tyger and Kay Denar to work on the majority of the album, with Diane Warren, TQ, Wayne Wilkins, and Connor's then-husband Marc Terenzi receiving songwriting credits and Brock Landers and Stephen Shape producing "Daddy's Eyes".

The album received generally mixed reviews from critics, with laut.de declaring its mixture of mainstream pop, contemporary R&B and soft hip hop beats as too polished and repetitive. Upon its release, Key to My Soul peaked at number eight on the German Albums Chart, becoming Connor's third consecutive top 10 album, while reaching the top 20 in Austria and Switzerland. Released weeks ahead the birth of her first child, the album spawned two singles only, including "Music Is the Key" featuring American a cappella group Naturally 7 and a remix version of "Just One Last Dance" featuring American boy band Natural, both of which became number-one hits in Germany.

Track listing

Charts

Weekly charts

Year-end charts

Certifications

References

External links
 SarahConnor.com — official site

2003 albums
Sarah Connor (singer) albums